Wheels is the third studio album by Canadian country music group The Road Hammers. Released on June 3, 2014 via Open Road Recordings, the album includes the singles "Get On Down the Road", "Mud" and "I've Been Everywhere".

Critical reception
Shenieka Russell-Metcalf of Top Country gave the album four and a half stars out of five, writing that "they have managed to infuse southern rock and country perfectly" and "this album is packed with eleven tracks that are more than worth the wait."

Track listing

Chart performance

Album

Singles

References

External links

2014 albums
The Road Hammers albums
Open Road Recordings albums